Match Day is a football computer game, published by Ocean Software in 1984 for the ZX Spectrum. It is the first game in the Match Day series, and was the creation of programmer Jon Ritman and Chris Clarke. Versions were later released for the Amstrad CPC and PCW, BBC Micro, Commodore 64 and MSX systems.

Background
Jon Ritman met Chris Clarke, formerly of Crystal Computing, at Artic Computing in 1983 where Clarke was marketing Bear Bovver, Ritman's latest game for the company. They decided on going freelance to produce a football game after discovering that distributors wanted to see a ZX Spectrum game comparable to International Soccer on the Commodore 64. By chance Ritman met David Ward, co-founder of Ocean Software, at a computer show and told him what he was working on. Several months later Ward called Ritman and offered him a £20,000 advance for the game which he accepted immediately. Ocean licensed the theme tune from Match of the Day from the BBC but not the title, naming it Match Day instead.

Gameplay

This was the first soccer game for the ZX Spectrum where large moving footballers characters could dribble, throw-in, take corners, etc. The game uses modified sprites from a Ritman's previous title Bear Bovver to create an almost isometric, but still ultimately side-on football title.

The game had 8 teams that the player could choose, such as Ritman Rovers, Clarke PR and Ocean United.  Players could rename the teams and redefine the team colours.

Reception
Match Day was released in late 1984 and became a best-seller over the Christmas period reaching number 2 in the charts behind Ghostbusters. The BBC micro version ported by Chris Roberts reached the top of the BBC charts in September 1985. Match Day sold over 50,000 copies

Legacy 
The sequel, Match Day II was much the same but incorporated two features still used today in most football titles - a deflection system, the ball could bounce off players, which meant headers were possible, and a shot power system, although it was as easy to accidentally backheel the ball with this system, as it was to hit a powerful shot.  The game is also similar to a previously, not published game by Jon Ritman, Soccerama.

Later, in 1995, Jon Ritman tried to release Match Day III, but the name of the game was changed to Super Match Soccer to avoid any potential legal issues.

References

External links

It Really Is All Over at Eurogamer
History of Computer Soccer at members.lycos.co.uk/Crispin_S

1984 video games
ZX Spectrum games
BBC Micro and Acorn Electron games
Amstrad CPC games
Commodore 64 games
Association football video games
Video games scored by Martin Galway
Ocean Software games
Video games developed in the United Kingdom
Multiplayer and single-player video games